Shahi Bridge or Munim Khan's Bridge or Akbari Bridge or Mughal Bridge or Jaunpur Bridge is a 16th-century bridge over river Gomti in Jaunpur, Uttar Pradesh, India.

Construction

Mughal Emperor Akbar ordered the construction of the Shahi Bridge, which was completed in the year 1568–69 by Munim Khan. It took four years to complete the bridge. It was designed by Afghan architect Afzal Ali.

Current use

The bridge was severely damaged in the 1934 Nepal–Bihar earthquake. Seven of its arches had to be rebuilt. In addition to its historical significance, the bridge is still in use.

The bridge is on the Protection & Conservation list of Directorate of Archaeology, (U.P.) since 1978.

The bridge is generally recognised as Jaunpur's most significant Mughal structure.

A new bridge parallel to Shahi Bridge was opened on 28 November, 2006 by the then Chief Minister of Uttar Pradesh, Mulayam Singh Yadav.

In literature
William Hodges in his book 'Select Views in India' mentions about bridge:

"The inundations have been frequently known to rise even over the bridge in so much that in the year 1774 a whole brigade of the British forces was passed over it in boats."

Rudyard Kipling's poem Akbar's Bridge mentions this bridge.

See also
Atala Masjid, Jaunpur
Jama Masjid, Jaunpur

References

Notes
 Alfieri, Bianca Maria. 2000. Islamic Architecture of the Indian Subcontinent. London: Laurence King Publishing, 103.

External links
 bridge across the Gomati River :: Jaunpur (India) -- Britannica
 Students' Britannica India By Dale Hoiberg, Indu Ramchandani
 India Perspectives: JAUNPUR: SHIRAZ OF INDIA
 Islamic studies in India By Mohamed Taher
 PROGRESS IN NANOTECHNOLOGY By Govind Prasad, Shardendu Kislaya
 Northeast India By Vanessa Betts, David Stott

Bridges completed in 1567
Bridges in Uttar Pradesh
Transport in Jaunpur, Uttar Pradesh
Mughal architecture
1567 establishments in India
Buildings and structures in Jaunpur, Uttar Pradesh
Tourist attractions in Jaunpur, Uttar Pradesh